Dik Trom is a series of Dutch children's books by Cornelis Johannes Kieviet, centered on the character Dik Trom (a mischievous oversized Dutch boy). The series is well regarded as a classic in its home country.

Books
 1891 Uit het leven van Dik Trom. Valkhoff & Co.
 1907 De zoon van Dik Trom. Valkhoff & Co.
 1912 Toen Dik Trom een jongen was. Kluitman.
 1920 Dik Trom en zijn dorpsgenoten . Kluitman.
 1923 Het tweede boek van Dik Trom en zijn dorpsgenoten. Kluitman.
 1931 De avonturen van Dik Trom. Kluitman.
 2016 The Wild Adventures of Dik Trom.

Film adaptations
Several Dutch movies were made based on the books:

 1937 Uit het leven van Dik Trom
 1947 Dik Trom en zijn dorpsgenoten
 1958 De Nieuwe Avonturen van Dik Trom
 1960 Dik Trom en het circus
 1972 Dik Trom en zijn dorpsgenoten
 1974 Dik Trom knapt het op
 1976 Dik Trom weet raad
 2010 Dik Trom

Comic book adaptation

Dick Matena also adapted the novel into a comic book album.

Sources

External links
  Uit het leven van Dik Trom E-book at Project Gutenberg
  De Zoon van Dik Trom E-book at Project Gutenberg
  Dik Trom statues
  Librivox: Dik Trom audio books
  Official site of the 2010 Dick Trom movie

Book series introduced in 1891
Dutch children's books
Series of children's books
1891 Dutch novels
Trom, Dik
Trom, Dik
Trom, Dik
Trom, Dik
Novels set in the Netherlands
Dutch novels adapted into films
Novels adapted into comics
Trom, Dik
1890s children's books
Trom, Dik